The General Electric Pittsfield Plant, which included Air Force Plant 69, was a plant of General Electric located in Pittsfield, Massachusetts. GE acquired the facilities of the Stanley Electric Manufacturing Company in 1903.

From circa 1932 until 1977, the Pittsfield Plant discharged PCB pollution to the Housatonic River. The U.S. Environmental Protection Agency  (EPA) designated the Pittsfield plant and several miles of the Housatonic as a Superfund site in 1997, and ordered GE to remediate the site. EPA and GE began a cleanup of the area in 1999.

GE demolished some buildings on the  site in the 1990s. Other buildings were demolished between 2001 and 2010. GE transferred some of the cleaned-up properties to the Pittsfield Economic Development Authority (PEDA). As of 2022 GE has completed remediation and restoration of the 10 manufacturing plant areas within the city, and GE and PEDA are conducting inspection, monitoring and maintenance activities. Cleanup of the polluted downstream river areas has not been completed as of 2022.

References

Plants of the United States Air Force
Buildings and structures in Pittsfield, Massachusetts
General Electric
Superfund sites in Massachusetts